Chrysorthenches drosochalca is a species of moth in the family Plutellidae first described by Edward Meyrick in 1905. It is endemic to New Zealand and has been found in the North and South Islands. The larvae are leaf miners of Prumnopitys ferruginea. Adults are on the wing from January to March.

Taxonomy 
This species was first described by Edward Meyrick in 1905 using specimens collected at Ōtira Gorge and Wellington and named Orthenches drosochalca. George Hudson discussed and illustrated this species in his 1928 book The butterflies and moths of New Zealand. In 1996 J. S. Dugdale placed this species in the genus Chrysorthenches. The male lectotype, collected by George Hudson in Wellington, is held at the Natural History Museum, London.

Description 

Hudson described the larva and pupa of this species as follows:

Meyrick described the adults of this species as follows:

This species is variable in size and in the intensity of the ground colour of the forewings. It can be distinguished from similar appearing species as its forewings have very scattered white scales as well as a more brassy foreground colour.

Distribution
C. drosochalca is endemic to New Zealand. It has been observed in both the North and South Islands.

Behaviour
The larvae feed in January. Adults are on the wing from January until March. The species has been collected by beating Prumnopitys ferruginea. When resting the forewings are closed  giving the moth the appearance of a cylinder. Both the larvae and the adult moth appear to overwinter.

Hosts

The larval host of this species is Prumnopitys ferruginea with the larvae of C. drosochaica mining the leaves of its host.

DNA analysis 
In 2020 this species along with the other species in the genus Chrysorthenches had their morphological characters studied.

References

Moths described in 1905
Plutellidae
Moths of New Zealand
Endemic fauna of New Zealand
Taxa named by Edward Meyrick
Endemic moths of New Zealand